"El Mañana" (Spanish for "The Tomorrow") is a song by British alternative rock band Gorillaz. It was released on 10 April 2006 in the United Kingdom as a double A-side, and the fourth and final singles from their album Demon Days. "El Mañana", along with its other A-side "Kids with Guns", reached number 27 upon its release in the UK.

The song's music video brings back certain elements from the band's music video for "Feel Good Inc.", released the year before.

Music video
The animated music video for "El Mañana" was released on 11 March 2006 from Passion Pictures, and directed by Jamie Hewlett and Pete Candeland. The video opens to Noodle on the same floating island seen in the music video for "Feel Good Inc.". Two helicopters, similar in design to the RAH-66 Comanche and the Bell AH-1Z Viper, intercept the island. The helicopters spot Noodle out in the open, and open fire upon her with rotary cannons, but fail to hit her. Noodle flees into the cover of the windmill, narrowly avoiding the rounds which penetrate the walls. The two helicopters smash into the windmill's sails, destroying them. The helicopters continue to strafe the floating island, setting fire to the foliage and the windmill. Noodle stumbles outside as the helicopters appear to break off and fly away, but is spotted. The helicopters turn around and strafe Noodle, but she again narrowly escapes the coming fire, taking refuge in the burning windmill. The island, now heavily damaged, plunges into a canyon below. The camera pans up and away as the island crashes into the ground, exploding. Above the crash zone, both helicopters hover. One of the helicopters opens its bomb bay doors, and drops an unguided bomb into the wreckage. The helicopters disengage, and the video fades to black. The music video isn't viewable in the United States on YouTube.

Track listings
UK CD single
 "Kids with Guns" – 3:45
 "El Mañana" – 3:50
 "Stop the Dams" – 5:39

UK DVD single
 "El Mañana" (music video) – 4:03
 "Kids with Guns" (music video) – 3:46
 "Don't Get Lost in Heaven" (Original Demo Version) – 2:29
 "El Mañana" (animatic) – 3:57

UK 7-inch single
 "Kids with Guns" – 3:45
 "El Mañana" – 3:50

European CD single
 "Kids with Guns" – 3:45
 "El Mañana" – 3:50
 "Stop the Dams" – 5:39
 "El Mañana" (music video) – 4:03

Japanese CD single
 "El Mañana" – 3:50
 "Kids with Guns" – 3:45
 "Stop the Dams" – 5:39
 "Don't Get Lost in Heaven" (Original Demo Version) – 2:29
 "El Mañana" (music video) – 4:03

UK digital single
 "Kids with Guns" (Hot Chip Remix) – 7:09

US digital single
 "El Mañana" – 3:50
 "Hong Kong" (Live in Manchester) – 6:36

US digital E.P.
 "El Mañana" – 3:50
 "Stop the Dams" – 5:39
 "Hong Kong" (Live in Manchester) – 6:36
 "Kids with Guns" (music video) – 3:46
 "El Mañana" (Live in Harlem video) – 3:59

Personnel
 Damon Albarn – vocals, synthesizers, electric guitar, string arrangements
 Simon Tong – acoustic guitar
 Al Mobbs – double bass
 Emma Smith – double bass
 Amanda Drummond – viola
 Stella Page – viola
 Antonia Pagulatos – violin
 Sally Jackson – violin
 Isabelle Dunn – cello
 Danger Mouse – drum programming, mixing
 Jason Cox – mixing, engineering
 Steve Sedgwick – mixing assistance
 James Dring – drum programming
 Howie Weinberg – mastering

Charts

Release history

References

External links
 Japanese release page
 MTV interview with Damon Albarn
 Yahoo! Launch Gorillaz video site, including "El Mañana"

2005 songs
2006 singles
Dub songs
Gorillaz songs
Parlophone singles
Song recordings produced by Danger Mouse (musician)
Songs written by Damon Albarn